is a passenger railway station located in the city of Fukaya, Saitama, Japan, operated by the private railway operator Chichibu Railway.

Lines

Station layout
The station is staffed and consists of a single island platform serving two tracks. Three freight loops and additional sidings lie to the north of the platform tracks.

Platforms

Adjacent stations

History
It was renamed Takekawa from 24 June 1903.

Passenger statistics
In fiscal 2018, the station was used by an average of 951 passengers daily.

Surrounding area
 Arakawa River

See also
 List of railway lines in Japan

References

External links

  

Railway stations in Japan opened in 1901
Railway stations in Saitama Prefecture
Stations of Chichibu Railway
Fukaya, Saitama